David Duvall Orr (born October 4, 1944) is an American Democratic politician who served as the Cook County Clerk from 1990 to 2018. Orr previously served as alderman for the 49th ward in Chicago City Council from 1979 to 1990. He briefly served as acting Mayor of Chicago from November 25 to December 2, 1987, following the death of Mayor Harold Washington. Orr retired from the office of Cook County Clerk in 2018, opting not to run for an eighth term.

Early life
Born in Chicago, Orr is a graduate of Simpson College in Indianola, Iowa. He was an instructor at Mundelein College in 1979, when he first decided to run for alderman.

Chicago City Council (1979-90)
Orr entered politics as an "independent Democrat", opposed to the official Democratic Party organization. The party organization was then controlled by the "Machine" created by Mayor Richard J. Daley, who died in December 1976. In February 1979, Orr was elected by a narrow margin of 320 votes alderman from the 49th Ward, which covered most of the Rogers Park neighborhood in the far northeastern corner of Chicago. 

Orr was considered a lakefront liberal.

Orr joined with other white "independent" aldermen from the "Lakefront" and black dissident aldermen from the south side and west side in opposing the corruption and racism of the Machine. Orr was re-elected in February 1983 and 1987. 

In February 1983, with the Machine divided between supporters of Jane Byrne and Richard M. Daley, black independent Harold Washington became Mayor. Washington was opposed by 29 aldermen who tried to paralyze city government for three years in what was dubbed "Council Wars." Orr backed Washington, one of only five white aldermen to do so. After the Washington coalition won the majority in 1986, after special aldermanic elections were held, Orr was elected by the City Council in 1987 to serve as the city's Vice Mayor. 

In 1986, Orr, with the assistance of fellow alderman Bernard Stone, successfully pushed an ordinance through City Council that declared Chicago a "nuclear-free zone".

As a city councilman, Orr often prevailed in getting the council to take actions which he fought for. Orr had a reputation of being a "clean" politician, devoid of corruption or negativity. Chicago Tribune columnist Mike Royko, a cynic towards local politics, stated in 1988, "there are three or four aldermen who are suspected of being honest and [Orr] is one of them."

In May 1988, the City Council voted to oust Orr from his position as Vice Mayor as retribution for his attempts to make reforms that would have held the council's committees more accountable for the budgets they manage.

After Orr resigned from the City Council in 1990 in order to serve as county clerk, then-mayor Richard M. Daley appointed Robert Clarke as his replacement. In the 1991 aldermanic election, Clarke was defeated by Joe Moore, whom Orr had endorsed.

Acting Mayor of Chicago (1987)
When Mayor Washington died of a heart attack on November 25, 1987, Orr, as Vice Mayor, became acting mayor. He took office on November 25 and served for a week until the Council elected a permanent replacement mayor. Orr was suggested as the obvious choice, but as a reformer, he was vehemently opposed by the remaining Machine aldermen, and many black Chicagoans wanted a black replacement for Washington. Alderman Eugene Sawyer, who was black, and before 1983 had been a Machine loyalist, was chosen instead on December 2, 1987. Orr chaired Council meetings as mayor on December 1, a memorial meeting for Washington, and on December 2, when Sawyer was selected as his replacement.

County Clerk (1990-2018)
In 1990, the office of Cook County clerk was vacated by Stanley T. Kusper, Jr. who ran unsuccessfully for president of the Cook County Board of Commissioners. Orr ran for the office, and won the Democratic primary handily with 56% of the vote against two opponents. He also won easily in the general election, receiving more votes than any other candidate for county office. He was re-elected in 1994, 1998, 2002, 2006, 2010, and 2014. In 1998, 2002, 2006, and 2010, he was unopposed for renomination, and faced only token opposition in the general election.

After taking office, Orr put in place reforms, including instituting a new ethics guide for employees of the Office of the Cook County Clerk.

In 1994, Orr was considered a potential front-runner if he entered the election for president of the Cook County Board of Commissioners, but he ultimately decided to run for reelection as clerk instead of seeking the position.

On June 21, 2017, he announced that he would not run for reelection to an eighth term. Karen Yarbrough, the then-Cook County Recorder of Deeds, succeeded Orr as the Clerk.

Subsequent career and activity
In 2013, Orr was appointed as a Senior Fellow at the Harris School of Public Policy Studies in the University of Chicago.

In June 2018, Orr founded a political action committee called Good Government Illinois, with the goal of supporting election reform, campaign finance reform, and candidates with shared goals. He supported several candidates in the 2019 Chicago aldermanic election, including Maria Hadden (who ran for his old 49th ward seat), Michael Rodriguez, Andre Vasquez, Matt Martin, Susan Sadlowski Garza, David Moore, and Scott Waguespack.

Orr considered running for mayor of Chicago in the 2019 Chicago mayoral election after incumbent mayor Rahm Emanuel declared in early September 2018 that he would no longer be seeking a third term. However, he ultimately did not run. In the week prior to the first round of the election, Orr publicly endorsed the candidacy of Lori Lightfoot.

In the 2023 Chicago mayoral election, Orr endorsed U.S. Representative Chuy Garcia's candidacy for mayor.

Accolades 
In 2012, Orr was inducted into the Chicago Gay and Lesbian Hall of Fame as a Friend of the Community.

Electoral history

Aldermanic

County Clerk
1990

1994

1998

2002

2006

2010

2014

References

1944 births
Living people
Chicago City Council members
Illinois Democrats
Mayors of Chicago
Simpson College alumni
Cook County Clerks